Beggars Opera was a Scottish progressive rock band from Glasgow, Scotland, formed in 1969 by guitarist Ricky Gardiner, vocalist Martin Griffiths, and bassist Marshall Erskine. The line-up consisted of Ricky Gardiner (guitar/vocals) (born 31 August 1948, Edinburgh, Scotland), Alan Park (keyboards) (born 10 May 1951, Glasgow, Scotland), Martin Griffiths (vocals) (born 8 October 1949, Newcastle upon Tyne) Marshall Erskine (bass/flute) and Raymond Wilson (drums). After working together building parts of the M40 Motorway near Beaconsfield, the lads moved back to Glasgow to look for an organist and drummer and found Alan Park and Ray Wilson. After an intensive time in rehearsal they took up residency at Burns Howff club/pub in West Regent Street in the center of Glasgow. Tours of Europe followed and the band found success in Germany, appearing on German TV's legendary Beat-Club, then at the First British Rock Meeting in Speyer in September 1971.

History

In 1970, after signing to Vertigo Records, the band recorded their first album Act One, and a single "Sarabande", which charted record in several European countries. The following year, for their second album, Waters of Change, the band were joined by Virginia Scott (mellotron) and Gordon Sellar (bass) (born 13 June 1947, Glasgow, Scotland). The single "Time Machine" from that album was successful in Germany, where the band toured extensively.

Erskine left the band before they recorded their third album, Pathfinder (1972), which included a cover version of Richard Harris' hit "MacArthur Park". Several other personnel changes ensued, with Pete Scott replacing Griffiths in 1972, and Linnie Paterson replacing Pete Scott in 1973. By 1973's final album, Get Your Dog Off Me, Beggars Opera were reduced to a trio of Gardiner, Park and Sellar.

In 1974/76 a new version of Beggars Opera recorded two albums for Jupiter Records in Germany: Sagittary, featuring Gardiner (guitar), Pete Scott (vocals), Virginia Scott (Mellotron) (born 1948, Glasgow,Scotland) and Mike Travis (drums), and Beggars Can't Be Choosers with Clem Cattini replacing Travis on drums.

Gardiner went on to play for David Bowie on the Low album, and with Iggy Pop on the Lust for Life album as well as his Idiot tour of 1976. He co-wrote "The Passenger" with Iggy Pop.

Alan Park (organist) worked with Cliff Richard for many years as musical director.

Griffiths sang and was compere in the working men's clubs in and around Manchester until he left for Germany in 1974. He went on tour and worked with Brian Auger, Osibisa, Ekseption, Klaus Doldinger, Ange and Can before signing a recording contract with Jupiter Records (Ralph Siegel) releasing three singles: "I’ll Be Coming Home", ”Sitting on the Dock of the Bay" and "Israelites", which reached number 3 in the German Disco Charts in 1977.

Discography
1970 Act One
1971 Waters of Change
1972 Pathfinder
1973 Get Your Dog Off Me!
1974 Sagittary
1975 Beggars Can't Be Choosers
1980 Lifeline
1996 The Final Curtain (compilation)
2007 Close to My Heart
2009 Touching the Edge
2010 All Tomorrows Thinking
2010 Suddenly Ahead Ahead
2011 Lose a Life (EP)
2011 Promise in Motion
2012 Mrs. Calagari's Lighter

References
Notes

Bibliography
Big Noise: The History of Scottish Rock 'n' Roll as Told by the People Who Made It by Martin Keilty.

External links
 Beggars Opera website
 
 

Scottish progressive rock groups
Musical groups established in 1969
Musical groups disestablished in 1976
1969 establishments in Scotland
1976 disestablishments in Scotland
Musical groups from Glasgow
Scottish rock music groups
Vertigo Records artists